Michael Kamil is an American bridge player.

Bridge accomplishments

Wins

 North American Bridge Championships (9)
 Reisinger (1) 2016 
 Norman Kay Platinum Pairs (1) 2013 
 Nail Life Master Open Pairs (1) 1992 
 Roth Open Swiss Teams (1) 2010 
 Vanderbilt (3) 1990, 2011, 2019 
 Mitchell Board-a-Match Teams (1) 2004 
 Roth Open Swiss Teams (1) 2005

Runners-up

 North American Bridge Championships (10)
 Silodor Open Pairs (2) 1998, 2003 
 Jacoby Open Swiss Teams (1) 2004 
 Roth Open Swiss Teams (1) 2013 
 Vanderbilt (5) 1995, 1999, 2003, 2010, 2023 
 Mitchell Board-a-Match Teams (1) 2014

Notes

American contract bridge players
Living people
Year of birth missing (living people)
Place of birth missing (living people)